Renato Civelli (born 14 October 1983 in Pehuajó) is a retired Argentine professional football player, who played as a centre-back. He retired in the summer 2021.

Career
Civelli started his career at Banfield in the Primera Division Argentina. After 2 years with the club he was signed by Marseille in January 2006, during the European winter transfer window. He returned to Argentina on a one-year loan contract after the 2006–07 season, joining Gimnasia at the start of the 2007 Apertura. From Feb 2009, due to the Julien Rodriguez's injury, he played as central defender for several matches gaining respect from both manager and supporters. 

Without a place in the team and after becoming Free Agent, Renato returned to Argentina to play in San Lorenzo de Almagro during the 2009–2010 league after refusing several offers made by English, German, Spanish, Italian and Belgian teams. On January 13, 2010, the Argentine agreed a contract with OGC Nice.

On 15 July 2013, Civelli joined Turkish Süper Lig for an undisclosed fee, signing a two-year contract.

Personal life
His younger brother, Luciano, was also a professional footballer, had played alongside Civelli for Banfield in the Argentine Primera División before his retirement.

References

External links

 Career statistics  at Irish Times
 Argentine Primera statistics at Futbol XXI
 Player Profile
 Marseille stats

1983 births
Living people
Argentine footballers
Argentine people of Italian descent
Sportspeople from Buenos Aires Province
Citizens of Italy through descent
Italian sportspeople of Argentine descent
Association football defenders
Club Atlético Banfield footballers
Olympique de Marseille players
Club de Gimnasia y Esgrima La Plata footballers
San Lorenzo de Almagro footballers
OGC Nice players
Bursaspor footballers
Lille OSC players
Club Atlético Huracán footballers
Argentine Primera División players
Ligue 1 players
Süper Lig players
Argentine expatriate footballers
Argentine expatriate sportspeople in France
Argentine expatriate sportspeople in Turkey
Expatriate footballers in France
Expatriate footballers in Turkey